Derrick Braxton (born November 25, 1981, New Brunswick, New Jersey) is an American record producer and composer, best known for working with artists such as Lupe Fiasco, Cassidy, Amerie, Rich Harrison and Raekwon.

Braxton is currently signed with 1st and 15th Entertainment/Atlantic Records.

Early life 
Braxton attended Hampton University in Hampton, VA and during his matriculation, he started meeting other students that had a love for music which piqued his interest. At the age of 19, he met super producer Swizz Beatz at NYC's WQHT Hot 97's own Funkmaster Flex's  annual car show in 2001. Braxton then signed under Swizz Beatz Fullsurface/J Records imprint for approximately 2 years. After that time, Braxton forged relationships and worked with Shae Haley, Chad Hugo, and Pharrell Williams of N.E.R.D. from 2003-2004. N.E.R.D. ended up signed Braxton under the Blackhole/StarTrak (also known as The Neptunes) imprint for 2 years.

1st & 15th Entertainment 
Braxton then met rapper Lupe Fiasco in 2005 and started working on such albums as "The Cool" and "Food and Liquor." Shortly after, Braxton signed a deal to 1st & 15th Entertainment/Atlantic Records in 2012.

Production discography

References 

1981 births
Living people
African-American record producers
Record producers from New Jersey
Songwriters from New Jersey
Musicians from New Brunswick, New Jersey
21st-century African-American people
20th-century African-American people